

General Info 
Calera High School is a high school located in Calera, Alabama. The principal is Christopher Myles, the assistant principals are Ms. Jennifer McCaleb, and Russell Leonard.

Student Profile 
So far in the 2022–23 school year, Calera High School has 970 students enrolled. Within that number, 49% of students are white, 38% of students are black, 11% of students are Hispanic, 2% of students are of two or more races, and 1% of students are Asian-American. 40% of students qualify for free or reduced-priced lunches.

Athletics 
The athletic teams compete in the 6A division of Alabama High School Athletic Association competition.

State Championships 
Basketball: 1996, 1997, 2006

Band 
The Calera High School Marching Band, also known as The Soaring Sound of Dixie, is the largest organization at the school.

In the 2022 season, They won best in class 3A in all categories and most entertaining at the Midsouth Marching Festival.

References

External links
School web site

Public high schools in Alabama
Schools in Shelby County, Alabama
Public middle schools in Alabama
1927 establishments in Alabama
Educational institutions established in 1927